"Polish genocide" may refer to:
 Massacres and religious segregation of Poles in Russian Empire after 1863 Uprising
 Massacres of Poles in Volhynia and Eastern Galicia
 Nazi crimes against the Polish nation
 Polish Operation of the NKVD
 Soviet repressions of Polish citizens (1939–1946) 
 Katyn massacre, a series of mass executions of Polish officers carried out by the Soviet Union

Disambig-Class Poland articles